Nandini Devi is an Indian politician who served as Member of Odisha Legislative Assembly from Sanakhemundi Assembly constituency. In 2014 Odisha Legislative Assembly election, she beat Ramesh Chandra Jena with 47.90% or 61,773 votes. She was the runner up for 2019 Odisha Legislative Assembly election.

Personal life 
She is from royal family of Dharakote. Her daughter, Gitanjali Devi is the youngest block chairman in Ganjam district. Her husband Kishore Chandra Singh Deo, her father-in-law Ananta Narayan Singh Deo and her mother-in-law Shanti Devi have been elected to state assembly several times from 1967.

References 

Year of birth missing (living people)
Living people
Odisha MLAs 2014–2019